Dutch DJ and record producer Robbert van de Corput, better known as Hardwell, has released two studio albums and eleven compilation albums, along with 116 singles. He first started producing in 2007 and gained international recognition with his bootleg of "Show Me Love vs Be" in 2009. In 2022, Hardwell returned with his second studio album, the 14-track Rebels Never Die.

Albums

Studio albums

Soundtrack albums

Compilation albums

Remix albums

DJ mix albums

Extended plays

Singles

Remixes

References

External links 
 Official website

Discographies of Dutch artists
Electronic music discographies
Production discographies